The City of Gympie is a former local government area in the south-east of Queensland, Australia, responsible for governing Gympie.

History

On 11 November 1879, the Gympie Division was created as one of 74 divisions within Queensland under the Divisional Boards Act 1879 with a population of 4338.

However, the residents felt that Gympie warranted a municipality and petitioned the Queensland Government. On 25 June 1880, the division was abolished in favour of a municipality, the Borough of Gympie which held its first elections on 25 August 1880.

A town hall was built in 1890.

On 4 January 1895, Glastonbury Division was abolished and split between the Widgee Division and the Borough of Gympie.

On 31 March 1903 the Borough of Gympie became the Town of Gympie under the Local Authorities Act 1902 and on 7 January 1905 was proclaimed City of Gympie by the Governor of Queensland.

On 19 March 1992, the Electoral and Administrative Review Commission, created two years earlier, produced its report External Boundaries of Local Authorities, and recommended that the City of Gympie and the Shire of Widgee should be amalgamated.  The recommendation was implemented through the Local Government (Shire of Cooloola) Regulation 1993 creating the new Shire of Cooloola on 2 November 1993. The first elections were held on 27 November 1993 and Adrian McClintock, the former Widgee chairman, was elected for a four-year term.

On 15 March 2008, under the Local Government (Reform Implementation) Act 2007 passed by the Parliament of Queensland on 10 August 2007, the Shire of Cooloola merged with the Shire of Kilkivan and Division 3 (Theebine/Gunalda areas) of Shire of Tiaro to form the Gympie Region.

Chairmen and Mayors
The following are the chairmen of Gympie Division:
 1880— : William Henry Couldery

The following are the mayors of Gympie Borough/Town/City: 
 1880–82: Matthew Mellor, also chairman of Widgee Divisional Board, and Member of the Legislative Assembly for Wide Bay and Gympie
 1882–83: William Ferguson (S.M.)
 1883–84: William Smyth
 1884–86: William Ferguson (S.M)
 1886–90: Lieut.-Col. William Ferguson
 1890–91: Edward Bytheway
 1891–92: John L Mathews
 1892–93: Abraham Hutchinson
 1893–94: John L Mathews
 1894–95: William Suthers
 1895–96: Edward Bytheway
 1896–97: William Suthers
 1897–98: Matthew Mellor
 1898–99: Daniel Mulcahy
 1899 – October 1899: George Ryland
 October 1899 – 1901: Daniel Mulcahy
 1902: Edgar Benjamin Davidson
 1902: Daniel C Dowling
 1903–04: David Elder Reid
 1904–05: Gilbert Garrick
 1905–07: George F. Lister 
 1907–08: Walter G. Ambrose
 1908–09: George A. Buist
 1909–11: William E. Burbidge
 1911–12: Richard H. Cox
 1912–13: Walter G. Ambrose
 1913–14: Alfred George Ramsey
 1914–16: Peter Green
 1916–17: Samuel D. Weller
 1917–18: George H. Mackay
 1918–19: R. Stitt
 1919–20: W. H. Sedgman
 1920–21: Luke J. Thomas (end of annual elections)
 1921–24: Luke J. Thomas
 1924–27: George Thomas 
 1927–30: Luke J. Thomas
 1930–March 1931: Alexander Glasgow
 1931–April 1937: Dr Luther Morris 
 1937–August 1941: Luke J. Thomas
 1941–70: Ronald N Witham
 1970–76: James E. Kidd
 1976–88: Minas J. Venardos
 1988–93 Joan E. Dodt

References

External links
 
 
 

Former local government areas of Queensland
1993 disestablishments in Australia